Willy Peirens (born 19 August 1936) is a former Belgian trade union leader.

Born in Deinze, Peirens was active in the Catholic Workers' Youth, becoming its national co-ordinator in 1959.  In 1968, he transferred to become youth officer at the Confederation of Christian Trade Unions (ACV), then in the early 1970s became the co-ordinator of its regional structure.  In 1977, he became secretary of the ACV's Flemish region, and in 1987, the ACV's national president.  In 1989, he was additionally elected as the president of the World Confederation of Labour.  He retired in 1999, but was made honorary president of the ACV.

References

1936 births
Living people
Belgian trade unionists
People from Deinze